Alexander Nørgaard (born 15 March 2000) is a Danish swimmer. He competed in the men's 1500 metre freestyle at the 2019 World Aquatics Championships. He competed in the men's 800 and 1500 metre freestyle at the 2020 Summer Olympics.

References

External links
 

2000 births
Living people
Place of birth missing (living people)
Danish male freestyle swimmers
Swimmers at the 2020 Summer Olympics
Olympic swimmers of Denmark